Manik Chauree Halt railway station is a minor railway station in Raipur district, Chhattisgarh. Its code is MCF. It serves Manik Chauree village. The station consists of 2 platforms. The station lies on the Abhanpur–Rajim branch line of Bilaspur–Nagpur section.

Major trains 

 Abhanpur–Rajim NG Passenger
 Rajim–Kendri NG Passenger

References

Railway stations in Raipur district
Raipur railway division